Darremsanga (born 25 November 1987) is an Indian cricketer. He made his first-class debut on 30 December 2018, for Mizoram in the 2018–19 Ranji Trophy. He made his Twenty20 debut on 27 February 2019, also for Mizoram, in the 2018–19 Syed Mushtaq Ali Trophy. He made his List A debut on 27 February 2021, for Mizoram in the 2020–21 Vijay Hazare Trophy.

References

External links
 

1987 births
Living people
Indian cricketers
Mizoram cricketers
Place of birth missing (living people)